The expression 'Hong Kong Royal Instructions' is most commonly used to refer to the Hong Kong Royal Instructions 1917, one of the principal constitutional documents of British Hong Kong (others being the Hong Kong Letters Patent 1917, the Hong Kong Letters Patent 1960, the Hong Kong Letters Patent 1982, and the Hong Kong Letters Patent 1991 (No. 1)); however, it may also refer to any other Hong Kong Royal Instructions or any Hong Kong Additional Instructions ('Hong Kong Royal Instructions' amending the pre-existing Hong Kong Royal Instructions), or be used as a generic term covering all Hong Kong Royal Instructions and all Hong Kong Additional Instructions.

List of all Hong Kong Royal Instructions and all Hong Kong Additional Instructions
Hong Kong Royal Instructions of 1843 (no formal short title)
Hong Kong Royal Instructions of 1886 (no formal short title)
Hong Kong Royal Instructions of 1888 (no formal short title)
Hong Kong Additional Instructions of 1896 (no formal short title)
Hong Kong Royal Instructions 1917
Hong Kong Additional Instructions of 1929 (no formal short title)
Hong Kong Additional Instructions 1938
Hong Kong Additional Instructions 1955
Hong Kong Additional Instructions 1964
Hong Kong Additional Instructions 1965
Hong Kong Additional Instructions 1967
Hong Kong Additional Instructions 1969
Hong Kong Additional Instructions 1970
Hong Kong Additional Instructions 1972
Hong Kong Additional Instructions 1976
Hong Kong Additional Instructions 1977
Hong Kong Additional Instructions 1980
Hong Kong Additional Instructions 1983
Hong Kong Additional Instructions 1984
Hong Kong Additional Instructions 1985
Hong Kong Additional Instructions 1986
Hong Kong Additional Instructions 1988
Hong Kong Additional Instructions 1990
Hong Kong Additional Instructions 1991
Hong Kong Additional Instructions 1992
Hong Kong Additional Instructions 1993 (No. 1)
Hong Kong Additional Instructions 1993 (No. 2)

See also
 History of Hong Kong
 Hong Kong Letters Patent
 Estatuto Orgânico de Macau, Portuguese Macau equivalent

British Hong Kong
History of Hong Kong
Law of Hong Kong
Defunct constitutions